The Landlord and Tenant Act 1988 (c 26) is an Act of the Parliament of the United Kingdom.

Section 7 - Short title, commencement and extent
Section 7(2) provides that the Act came into force at the end of the period of two months that began on the date on which it was passed. The word "months" means calendar months. The day (that is to say, 29 July 1988) on which the Act was passed (that is to say, received royal assent) is included in the period of two months. This means that the Act came into force on 29 September 1988.

See also
Landlord and Tenant Act

References
Halsbury's Statutes,

External links
The Landlord and Tenant Act 1988, as amended from the National Archives.
The Landlord and Tenant Act 1988, as originally enacted from the National Archives.

United Kingdom Acts of Parliament 1988
Landlord–tenant law